The Brian Jonestown Massacre is the eighteenth studio album by American band The Brian Jonestown Massacre. It was released in March 2019 under A Recordings.

Track listing

Charts

References

2019 albums
The Brian Jonestown Massacre albums